Jennifer Leitham (born John Leitham, August 10, 1953) is an American musician and double bass player. Being left-handed, she has also used the nicknames "Lefty" or "The Southpaw."

Career

Her first musical influences included The Beatles and the music of Vince Guaraldi from the Peanuts holiday cartoons. She started performing in high school when she joined the chorus, revealing an aptitude for music. Her first music teacher was Al Stauffer and her music education grew thanks to the mentorship of some of the giants of the bass world, such as Milt Hinton, George Duvivier, and Slam Stewart.

An active live performer, Leitham has been bassist on more than 125 recordings including ten of her own. She is known for long associations with Mel Torme and Doc Severinsen. She has also appeared with Woody Herman, George Shearing, Gerry Mulligan, Peggy Lee, Joe Pass, Cleo Laine, Louis Bellson, Pete Rugolo, Bill Watrous, k.d. lang, Take 6, Milcho Leviev, Jon Hendricks, Annie Ross, Bob Dorough, Eartha Kitt and been a member of The Tonight Show All-Stars, The Woody Herman Thundering Herd, the Benny Carter Quintet, and the Bob Cooper Quartet.

Leitham has performed as a featured artist or group member at major jazz festivals in North America and internationally. and has been a presenter at workshops and clinics in the U.S. She has performed clinics and master classes at many major universities and was jazz bass instructor at CSULB. She has been a featured artist at many of the world’s most prestigious jazz festivals and clubs. She has appeared with her trio at some of the finest venues in the world, including the Blue Note, Iridium, Smalls, and Dizzy’s Club Coca-Cola in New York, The Toronto Pride Fest, also festivals in France and The Netherlands, Hungary and Japan, Mammoth Lakes and Sweet and Hot Jazz Festivals in California, Blues Alley in Washington, DC, Catalina's, Blue Whale, The Jazz Bakery, The Lighthouse, Donte's. Carmello's, Alphonse's, and Cafe 322 in Los Angeles, Shanghai Jazz, the Deer Head Inn in the Delaware Water Gap and a host of others.

Leitham own recordings include Leitham Up, The Southpaw, Lefty Leaps In, Live! and Two for the Road (a duo with guitarist Jimmy Bruno). Her 2006 release, The Real Me, features her original compositions and arrangements and, for the first time, her singing voice. Additionally 2008's critically acclaimed Left Coast Story, the 2011 release of a live DVD The Real Me Live, her 2014 release Future Christmas, and her 2015 release "MOOD(S)WINGS". Also, the Mood(S)wings album was voted one of the Top 3 CDs of 2015 by the readers of "JazzEd" magazine. Her observations on the events of the day were reflected in her 2019 release Remnants Of Humanity.

Personal life

In 2001 Leitham transitioned from being known as John Leitham.

Documentary

Leitham is the subject of an award-winning documentary, "I Stand Corrected". It premiered and won the best film award at the American Documentary Film Festival in April, 2012.

Discography

As John Leitham

 Leitham Up (1992)
 The Southpaw (1994)
 Lefty Leaps In (1996)
 Live (1998)
 Two For the Road with Jimmy Bruno (2000)

As Jennifer Leitham

 Two For the Road (2005) re-release
 The Real Me (2006)
 Left Coast Story (2008)
 The Real Me Live [MP3] (2011)
 The Real Me Live [DVD] (2011)
 Future Christmas (2014)
 Mood(S)wings (2015)
 Remnants of Humanity (2019)

References

External links
 www.jenniferleitham.com
 www.istandcorrectedmovie.com

American women jazz musicians
American double-bassists
Living people
1953 births
American LGBT musicians
Transgender women
Transgender musicians
20th-century double-bassists
20th-century American musicians
21st-century American double-bassists
21st-century American women musicians
The Tonight Show Band members
20th-century American women musicians
Transgender women musicians